Richard Charles "Chuck" Bown Jr. (born February 22, 1954) is a former NASCAR champion. His last ride came in 1999. He lives with his wife in Asheboro, North Carolina. He is the brother of former fellow NASCAR competitor Jim Bown.

1970s 
Bown made his NASCAR debut in 1972 in the Winston Cup Series. At the age of seventeen, he ran the Winston Western 500 at Riverside International Raceway the No. 27 Plymouth owned by his father Dick. Bown started 22nd but finished 32nd that day after crashing on lap 88. Bown made 2 more starts in the No. 27 that year, with his best finish being fourteenth at the second Riverside race.

In 1973, Bown returned to the Winston Cup Series driving his father's No. 03 Dodge, finishing in the top-10 for the first time in his career at the Tuborg 400 at Riverside. In 1974, Bown again competed in the three California races on the Winston Cup Series schedule, the two events at Riverside as well as at Ontario Motor Speedway. His best finish was 20th. In 1976, Bown began driving for Gerald Cracker, driving the No. 01 Chevrolet in four races, and the No. 03 at Riverside, where he had his best finish. Bown was named the Most Popular Driver of the Year in the NASCAR Winston West Series in 1977. In 1979, Bown drove Jim Testa's No. 68 Buick and Chevrolet in 7 Winston Cup events. He scored a 7th-place finish in the Daytona 500 and a 6th-place finish in the Firecracker 400. He drove eleven races for the next two years for different owners, but did not reach the top-ten.

1986–1993 
In 1986, Bown returned to NASCAR, running in the Busch Series. His first start came at the Goody's 300, where he started 28th but finished 40th after wrecking his No. 67 Buick early in the race. He made his only other start of the year at the Oxford 250 at Oxford Plains Speedway, where he's started 13th and won his first career Busch race. The following season, Bown ran three races in the No. 7/56 Pontiac, but did not finish a race.

In 1989, Bown ran his first full season in Busch driving the No. 63 Pontiac at Lanier Speedway and at South Boston Speedway. He finished the season with 5 top-5s and 12 top-10s wound up ninth in the championship standings. The following year, Bown won six races and four poles. He had a total of thirteen top-fives and won the Busch Series championship over Jimmy Hensley by 200 points. That same season, he returned to the Cup series, running three races in the No. 97 Pontiac for Tex Powell, his best finish 23rd at the Atlanta Journal 500.

In 1991, Bown won three times and garnered four poles, but dropped 4th in the Busch Series points. He made one Winston Cup start driving Cale Yarborough's No. 66 Pontiac at North Wilkesboro Speedway where he finished 26th. The following season, Bown failed to win a race and had only five top-five finishes, and dropped to eleventh in the standings. In 1993, Bown won his final career pole at Richmond International Raceway and won his final race at Martinsville Speedway. He recorded 5 top-5s and 13 top-10s en route to a fourth-place points finish. He made one Winston Cup start driving the Roulo Brothers' No. 39 Chevrolet at Phoenix, finishing 24th.

Final years 

In 1994, Bown moved back up to the Cup series, driving the No. 12 Ford Thunderbird for Bobby Allison. He won the pole for the Food City 500, setting a new track record. He was seriously injured in a wreck at Pocono Raceway which sidelined him for the season.

Bown returned to racing in 1995 in four Busch races, finishing ninth at Charlotte Motor Speedway in the No. 05 Key Motorsports Ford.  He competed in nine Cup races in the No. 32 Chevrolet Monte Carlo for Active Motorsports, his best finish a 21st at Charlotte. In 1996, Bown drove for a variety of teams in the Busch Series, his best finish 21st at Darlington Raceway. He drove the Sadler Brothers Racing' No. 95 Ford in three Winston Cup Series events but only finished one race.

In 1997, Bown began racing in the Craftsman Truck Series, driving the No. 99 Ford F-150 for Roush Racing. Despite not winning a race, he had four top-fives and finished ninth in the standings. The next season, Bown qualified on the pole at the season opener at Walt Disney World Speedway, but finished 25th. After that race, he was released from Roush due to downsizing. He moved to the No. 57 CSG Motorsports Ford driving in six events before being released. He ended the season driving the No. 67 Chevrolet Silverado in a pair of races, finishing seventeenth at Phoenix.

In 1999, Bown returned to Hensley to drive their No. 63 Chevrolet. Despite a seventh-place finish at Charlotte, Bown was released from the team halfway into the season, and soon retired.

Motorsports career results

NASCAR
(key) (Bold – Pole position awarded by qualifying time. Italics – Pole position earned by points standings or practice time. * – Most laps led.)

Winston Cup Series

Daytona 500 results

Busch Series

Craftsman Truck Series

Awards 
Bown was inducted in the West Coast Stock Car Hall of Fame in 2009 along with Wayne Spears, Doug George, and Rick Carelli.

References

External links 
 
Speedway Media profile

Living people
1954 births
Racing drivers from Portland, Oregon
NASCAR drivers
CARS Tour drivers
NASCAR Xfinity Series champions
RFK Racing drivers